Björn Joppien (born January 30, 1981) is a male badminton player from Germany.

Career
Joppien played badminton at the 2004 Summer Olympics in men's singles, defeating Kasperi Salo of Finland in the first round. In the round of 16, Joppien was defeated by Ronald Susilo of Singapore.

In 2007 Joppien won the Men's Singles at the German National Badminton Championships.

In 2010 Joppien retired from professional Badminton because he had recurrent back problems.

References

External links 
 
 
 
 

1981 births
Living people
German male badminton players
Olympic badminton players of Germany
Badminton players at the 2004 Summer Olympics